Public opinion on the 2009 Honduran coup d'état is divided in Honduras. There are three known opinion polls on the 2009 Honduran constitutional crisis. The polls show polarized Honduras. The first CID-Gallup showed support for President Manuel Zelaya's removal from office because of his actions but not the manner in which it was carried out. Subsequent opinion polls showed higher levels of opposition to the events of the coup, though the opinion of the government it inaugurated was more evenly mixed. According to the latest poll in October, only 48% of Hondurans regard Roberto Micheletti's performance as good or excellent, and 50% as bad or poor. Porfirio Lobo Sosa, an opposition member, led polls before the November elections and subsequently won the elections.

Before the coup
In a 2008 survey, only one in four Hondurans approved Zelaya - the lowest approval rate of 18 regional leaders. On June 22 La Prensa counted that people had organized 18 Facebook groups against Manuel Zelaya. Tens of thousands Hondurans had joined the Internet campaigns against Zelaya.

Opinion polls

CID-Gallup poll comment

CID-Gallup conducted a poll in 16 of the nation's 18 departments between 30 June and 4 July, but the results were reported initially to the press on 9 July and 10 July, leading to confusion.  Honduran newspapers, such as El Heraldo, and some news sources outside Honduras, such as the Washington Post, reported that when asked whether they believed the removal of President Zelaya was justified, 41% agreed, 28% disagreed, and 31% said don't know/won't answer. However, the New York Times, the Associated Press, and others reported, possibly based upon an interview of the President of CID-Gallup, that 46% disagreed with Zelaya's ouster, 41% approved of it, with 13% declining to answer.

A blogger obtained the original data from CID-Gallup and explained the inconsistency.  CID-Gallup asked two different questions:

Q: Do you consider the actions taken by Mel Zelaya with respect to the fourth ballot box to have justified his dismissal from the post of President of the Republic?
¿Considera usted que las acciones que tomó Mel Zelaya con respecto a la cuarta urna justificaban su destitución del puesto de Presidente de la República?
Yes 41%, No 28%, Don't know/No answer: 31%.

Q: Do you agree with the action taken last Sunday that removed President Zelaya from the country?
¿Cuánto está usted de acuerdo con la acción que se tomó el pasado domingo que removió el Presidente Zelaya del país?
Support 41%, Oppose 46%, Don't know/No Answer 13%.

Some press sources reported the results from the first question, and some the results from the second question.

See also 

Honduran general election, 2009

References

Public Opinion
2009 Honduran Coup